Yuzurihara is a village in Yamanashi Prefecture in Japan which in 1955, together with the villages of Nishihara, Shimada, Otsuru, Iwaomura, Koto and Ome, were merged into the municipality of Uenohara.

Longevity research
In 2000 Yuzurihara was the subject of an ABC documentary  which highlighted the fact that many of the villagers who lived in Yuzurihara had very young skin, healthy hair and were extremely supple. They also lived longer and did not appear to exhibit the signs of aging which commonly occur at this age. Many of the people were in their 80s and 90s but looked years younger. The World Health Organization conducted research of 990 villages and towns in Japan; it was found that there were 10 times more people living beyond the age of 85 in Yuzurihara than there were in North America.

The villagers of Yuzurihara were found to have high levels of hyaluronic acid in their diet, which is the main reason why their skin appeared wrinkle free and their hair grew thick. Hyaluronic acid is used in many topical skin serums and creams for anti-aging. This is chemically related to naturally occurring hyaluronan, the purpose of which is to hold moisture the skin and can increase moisture absorption by up to 1000 times.

References

Davids, K (2015). Hyaluronic Acid: Experience Skin and Joint Health Benefits (Google eBook). usa: Ebooks. 101
J.Japonica (2011). Jacks Japonica. Canada: Xlibris Corporation. 173
Babel, K. (2011). Tremella Beauty Mushroom. In: Mushrooms for Health and Longivity. US: Books Alive. 10.

Villages in Yamanashi Prefecture
Uenohara, Yamanashi
Populated places disestablished in 1955
1955 disestablishments in Japan